The Roman Catholic Diocese of Melaka-Johor (Latin: Dioecesis Melakana-Giohorana) is a diocese of the Latin Church of the Catholic Church in the Ecclesiastical province of Kuala Lumpur in Malaysia. It is located in southern region of Peninsular Malaysia, administering Melaka and Johor states.

The mother church is the Cathedral of the Sacred Heart of Jesus, in Johor Bahru, Johor(e); there is also a former Cathedral, now Church of St. Peter, in Melaka.

History 
 Established on 4 February 1558 as the Diocese of Malacca on territory split off from the then Diocese of Goa, within the Portuguese colonial empire.
 It became suffragan (other being Roman Catholic Diocese of Cochin) to the promoted Roman Catholic Archdiocese of Goa
 Lost territory on 23 January 1576 to establish the Roman Catholic Diocese of Macau (China)
 Lost territory in 1712 to establish the Apostolic Prefecture of Islands of the Indian Ocean 
 1838: Suppressed, its territory being joined with Siam
 Restored on 10 September 1841, albeit again with pre-diocesan status and exempt, as the Apostolic Vicariate of Western Siam, on territory split off from the then Apostolic Vicariate of Siam
 Promoted on 19 August 1888 as the  Diocese of Malacca
 Promoted on 19 September 1953 as (non-metropolitan) Archdiocese of Malacca
 25 February 1955: Promoted as Metropolitan Archdiocese of Malacca-Singapore, having lost territories to establish the Dioceses of Kuala Lumpur (now its Metropolitan) and of Penang
 On 18 December 1972, the diocese was demoted and renamed as the Diocese of Malacca-Johor, when the Archdiocese of Malacca-Singapore was split into the Archdiocese of Singapore and this diocese. Rt. Rev James Chan was appointed as the first Bishop.
 On 27 May 1985, its name was changed to the Diocese of Melaka-Johor. The diocese is suffragan of the Metropolitan Archdiocese of Kuala Lumpur.
 On 13 February 2003, Rt. Rev Paul Tan Chee Ing, SJ was appointed as the second Bishop of the Melaka-Johor Diocese. 
 On 19 November 2015, the Vatican appointed Rt. Rev Anthony Bernard Paul as the third Bishop of this Diocese.

Ordinaries 
Suffragan bishops of the (First) Diocese of Malacca
 Jorge de Santa Luzia (1558–1576)
 João Ribeiro Gaio (1589 – death 1601)
 Gonçalvo (Gonzalo) da Silva (1613–1632), later Bishop of Ceuta (Spain) (1632.09.06 – 1645) and Apostolic Prefect of Marocco (Morocco) (1632.09.06 – death 1649.02.16)
Gregório dos Anjos (? – 1677.08.30 not possessed), later Bishop of São Luís do Maranhão (Brazil) (1677.08.30 – death 1689.05.11)
 Antonio a S. Theresia (1691-?)
 Emmanuel a S. Antonio (1701–1738)
 Antonius de Castro (3 Sep 1738 – death 9 Aug 1743)
 Miguel de Bulhões e Souza (28 Mar 1746  – 8 Dec 1747), later Coadjutor Bishop of Belém do Pará (Brazil) (8 Dec 1747  – 18 May 1748), succeeding as Bishop of Belém do Pará (18 May 1748  – 24 Mar 1760), finally Bishop of Leiria (Portugal) (24 Mar 1760 – death 14 Sep 1779)
 Gerardus a S. Joseph (19 Feb 1748 – death 1760.01)
 Alexandre da Sagrada Familia Ferreira da Silva (16 Dec 1782  – 14 Feb 1785), later Bishop of São Paulo de Loanda (Angola) (14 Feb 1785  – 23 Nov 1787), Bishop of Angra (Portugal) (18 Dec 1815 – death 23 Apr 1818)
 Francisco de São Damazo Abreu Vieira (29 Oct 1804  – 15 Mar 1815), later Metropolitan Archbishop of São Salvador da Bahia (Brazil) (15 Mar 1815  – 18 Nov 1816)

Apostolic Vicars of Malacca-Singapore
 Jean-Paul-Hilaire-Michel Courvezy, Paris Foreign Missions Society (M.E.P.) (10 Sep 1841  – 7 Sep 1844), Titular Bishop of Bitha (5 Apr 1832 – death 1 May 1857); previously Coadjutor Apostolic Vicar of Siam (Thailand) (5 Apr 1832  – 30 Mar 1834) succeeded as Apostolic Vicar of Siam (30 Mar 1834  – 10 Sep 1841)
 Jean-Baptiste Boucho (3 Jun 1845  – 6 Mar 1871), Titular Bishop of Attalia (10 Jun 1845  – 6 Mar 1871)
 Michel-Esther Le Turdu (6 Mar 1871 – death 10 May 1877), Titular Bishop of Corycus (23 Jan 1871  – 10 May 1877), succeeding as former Coadjutor Apostolic Vicar of Western Siam (23 Jan 1871  – 6 Mar 1871)
 Edouard Gasnier (28 Mar 1878  – 19 Aug 1888 see below), Titular Bishop of Eucarpia (28 Mar 1878  – 19 Aug 1888)

Suffragan Bishops of the (Second) Diocese of Malacca
 Edouard Gasnier (19 Aug 1888 – death 8 Apr 1896)
 René-Michel-Marie Fée (21 Jul 1896 – death 20 Jan 1904)
 Marie-Luc-Alphonse-Emile Barillon (10 May 1904  – 10 Jan 1933), emeritate as Titular Bishop of Thaumacus (10 Jan 1933  – 27 Jul 1935)
 Adrien Pierre Devals (27 Nov 1933 – death 17 Jan 1945)
 Michel Olçomendy (21 Jan 1947  – 19 Sep 1953 see below)

 Archbishop of Malacca
 Michel Olçomendy (see above 19 Sep 1953  – 25 Feb 1955 see below)

Metropolitan Archbishop of Malacca-Singapore
 Michel Olçomendy (see above 25 Feb 1955  – 18 Dec 1972), also President of Catholic Bishops' Conference of Malaysia, Singapore and Brunei (1964–1969); later Archbishop of Singapore (Singapore) (18 Dec 1972 – 1976)

Suffragan Bishop of Malacca-Johor
 James Chan Soon Cheong (18 Dec 1972 – 1985 see below)

Suffragan Bishops of Melaka-Johor
 James Chan Soon Cheong (see above 1985 – retired 10 Dec 2001)
 Paul Tan Chee Ing (13 Feb 2003 – retired 19 Nov 2015), also President of Catholic Bishops' Conference of Malaysia, Singapore and Brunei (1 Jan 2011 – 2012.08)
 Anthony Bernard Paul (12 January 2016 – present)

Clergy 
 Msgr. Peter Ng Lai Huat
 Msgr. Michael Mannayagam
 Rev. James Rajendran
 Rev. Anthony Nge Lee Kiang
 Rev. Sebastian Koh Siong Yong, SJ
 Rev. Adrian Francis
 Rev. Alexuchelvam Mariasoosai
 Rev. Claurence Motoyou, OFM
 Rev. Cyril Mannayagam
 Rev. Damian Charles Pereira
 Rev. Devadasan Madala Muthu
 Rev. Edward Rayappan
 Rev. Jason Wong Kok Cheak
 Rev. Joseph (Joe) Matthews, OFM Cap
 Rev. John Baptist Yoew Kah Chok
 Rev. John Chia Khee Long, CDD
 Rev. John Kelvin Pereira
 Rev. Joseph Heng Chon Sin
 Rev. Joseph Lee Hock Jin, OFM
 Rev. Lawrence Ng Yew Kim
 Rev. Lionel Thomas
 Rev. Louis Chin Soon Teck
 Rev. Martinian Lee Hock Chuan
 Rev. Matthew Bun Chang Yong
 Rev. Dr. Michael Teng Woon Pheng
 Rev. Moses Rayappan Paul Raj
 Rev. Moses Yap Poh Sing, OFM
 Rev. Neville Arul Sinnappah
 Rev. Patrick Tyoh Kai Hong
 Rev. Paul Sia Chau Kiang
 Rev. Paul Wong Poh Loke
 Rev. Ryan Innas Muthu
 Rev. Simon Yong Kong Beng, SJ
 Rev. Thomas Chong Tet Fook, SJ
 Rev. Thomas Koo Kwai Fong, CDD

Retired 
 Rev. Bartholomew K.C. Wong
 Rev. Benedict Yee Yat Chong
 Rev. Lucas Ho

See also 
 Roman Catholicism in Malaysia
 List of Roman Catholic dioceses (structured_view)- Episcopal Conference of Malaysia, Singapore and Brunei
 List of Catholic dioceses in Malaysia

References

External links 
 
 www.catholic-hierarchy.org | Diocese of Malacca-Johor
 www.gcatholic.org | Diocese of Malacca-Johor

Roman Catholic dioceses in Malaysia
Christian organizations established in 1972
Malacca-Johor